Hubertus, Prince of Hohenlohe-Langenburg (born 2 February 1959 in Mexico City, as Hubertus Rudolph zu Hohenlohe-Langenburg) is a Mexican alpine skier, photographer, businessman, and a pop singer known as Andy Himalaya and Royal Disaster. He belongs to a family which, until the early 19th century, reigned over the territory of Hohenlohe-Langenburg in what is now northeastern Baden-Württemberg, Germany.

Life and family

Hubertus, Prince of Hohenlohe-Langenburg was born as the second son of Prince Alfonso of Hohenlohe-Langenburg and Princess Ira von Fürstenberg, Hubertus was born in Mexico City, Mexico, where his father ran a Volkswagen factory. His maternal grandparents were Tassilo, Prince of Fürstenberg (1903–1987) and Clara Agnelli, and his maternal great-grandparents were Karl Emil, Prince of Fürstenberg (1867–1945) and the Hungarian Countess Maria Mathilde Georgina Festetics de Tolna (24 May 1881 – 2 March 1953). His grandmother is half Mexican.

He lived in Mexico for the first four years of his life and then moved to Spain. He later studied in Austria and his main residence was in Vienna, where he works as a photographer and artist. Although he has Mexican nationality, which makes him eligible to compete for Mexico, he only spends a few weeks per year there. He is fluent in several languages and grew up in Europe, mainly Austria.

He had a brother named Christoph (1956–2006) and has two half-sisters, Arriana Theresa, Princess of Hohenlohe-Langenburg (b. 1975) and Désirée, Countess d'Ursel (b. 1980). He currently resides in Liechtenstein, of which he is also a citizen. His uncle, Max von Hohenlohe, competed at the 1956 Winter Olympics. He was a first cousin of the late Prince Marco of Hohenlohe-Langenburg, 19th Duke of Medinaceli. He is married to Simona Gandolfi, cousin of the famous Italian skier Alberto Tomba.

He acted as co-producer for Yello and Shirley Bassey's 1987 collaborative single "The Rhythm Divine". He has work on display with the Art of the Olympians. He hosts the travel show Hubertusjagd on Redbull TV.

Sports career

Hohenlohe founded the Mexican Ski Federation in 1981. He first skied for Mexico at a Winter Olympics at the 1984 games in Sarajevo, and he managed to finish 26th in slalom. After the 1984 Winter Olympics, Hohenlohe managed to participate in 1988, 1992, and 1994 Games. He qualified for the 2006 Winter Olympics in Turin, Italy, but the Mexican Olympic Committee decided not to send a one-man team to the Winter Games that year.

Hohenlohe has stated that the only reason why he continues to participate is because it seems that the "exotic skiers" (those from countries without a tradition in winter sports) are disappearing, and that he wants to keep that tradition alive. Since 1982, he has participated in 15 World Championships and set a World Record. Hohenlohe was expected to retire following the 2007 Alpine Skiing World Championships, after breaking his leg during a World Cup slalom race on January 28, 2007, eliminating him from the competition in Åre.

He came back to competition in 2009 and competed in his 12th World Championship, the 2009 Alpine Skiing World Championships.

He was the sole athlete in the Mexican team at the 2010 Winter Olympics. He participated in two alpine skiing disciplines, the Men's Giant Slalom (78th) and the Men's Slalom (46th).  At 51, he was the oldest athlete at the games. He also competed at the 2014 Winter Olympics, where he was Mexico's sole athlete again. He participated in slalom but did not finish after a fall during the first run.

In 2015, he was joined by Sarah Schleper on the Mexican ski team, doubling its size, at the FIS Alpine World Ski Championships of that year.

Hohenlohe, affectionately called El Príncipe, mooted retiring for 2017, but instead decided to qualify for the 2018 Winter Olympics. Another two hopes for Alpine Mexico, aside from Hubertus, and Schleper, are Rodolfo Dickson and Jocelyn McGillivray. Additionally, three more hope to represent Mexico, Robby Franco in freestyle skiing, Sandra Hillen in snowboard and German Madrazo in Cross-country skiing. He failed to qualify for the 2018 Olympics, but designed the race suits for the Mexican alpine skiers.

World Championships results
Hohenlohe participated at 19 editions of FIS Alpine World Ski Championships, from Schladming 1982 to Cortina 2021, from the age of 23 up to 62.

Ancestry

References
Notes

External links 
 
 Hubertus Hohenlohe's home page/music site

1959 births
Living people
Agnelli family
Fürstenberg (princely family)
Mexican businesspeople
Mexican photographers
Mexican male alpine skiers
Mexican people of German descent
20th-century Austrian male singers
Sportspeople from Mexico City
Olympic alpine skiers of Mexico
Alpine skiers at the 1984 Winter Olympics
Alpine skiers at the 1988 Winter Olympics
Alpine skiers at the 1992 Winter Olympics
Alpine skiers at the 1994 Winter Olympics
Alpine skiers at the 2010 Winter Olympics
Alpine skiers at the 2014 Winter Olympics
Hubertus Of Hohenlohe-Langenburg, Prince
Hubertus Of Hohenlohe-Langenburg, Prince
Mexican nobility
Royal Olympic participants
Mexican people of Italian descent